The Carson Circuit Transit System is a primary provider of mass transportation in the city of Carson, Los Angeles County, California. Bus service operated Monday through Saturday. Prior to March 28, 2020, in which service was suspended amid the COVID-19 pandemic, the Carson Circuit provided 7 Routes around the City of Carson and provides bus connections to Metro, Torrance Transit, Long Beach Transit, and GTrans. There was a North-South Shuttle route that traveled throughout Carson starting and ending at the Harbor Gateway Transit Center. Carson Circuit was operated by MV Public Transportation.

On September 17, 2019, Carson City Council is looking into allocating the Carson Circuit routes to the Long Beach Transit.

On March 28, 2020, Carson Circuit suspended services due to respect for the ongoing COVID-19 pandemic. However, the Dial-A-Ride was still in service, catering to local residents. 

At a July 20, 2021 City Council Meeting, Long Beach Transit proposed three new routes that they will acquire from Carson Circuit. The acquisition is expected to commence as early as September 2021. The shift in bus travel would replace the neighborhood-serving routes of the former Carson Circuit, which historically had low ridership, with longer-distance regional service, connecting several communities along the line.

On September 7, 2021, City Council is planning on reestablishing Carson Circuit "as a staff-operated supplemental bus service utilizing existing minibuses". When this will happen will be discussed at a future City Council meeting.

On December 23, 2021, it is announced that Carson Circuit will be revived with two new routes. Service would resume on January 3, 2022.

Routes

Fleet

References

Public transportation in Los Angeles County, California
Bus transportation in California
Transportation in Los Angeles County, California
Carson, California